Pico Nature Park is a Portuguese nature park located on the island of Pico, on the Azores. Created in 2008, it is the largest nature park of the archipelago, occupying 35% of the island (equivalent to ) plus  of marine domain.

References

Pico Island
Pico